Ischnochiton evanida is a species of chiton in the genus Ischnochiton of the family Ischnochitonidae.

This species can be found in Australia and Tasmania.

References

Chitons of Australia
Chitons described in 1840
Ischnochitonidae